Zibashahr (formerly, Khulenjan (Persian: خولنجان), also Romanized as Khūlenjān, Khvolenjān, and Khavlanjān) is a city and capital of Garkan-e Jonubi District, in Mobarakeh County, Isfahan Province, Iran and Included three religions, Adargan (Persian: آدرگان), Lenj (Persian: لنج) and Khulenjan (Persian: خولنجان).  At the 2006 census, its population was 9,071, in 2,466 families.

References

Populated places in Mobarakeh County

Cities in Isfahan Province